The Ford Foundation Center for Social Justice (also known as 321 East 42nd Street, 320 East 43rd Street, or the Ford Foundation Building) is a 12-story office building in East Midtown Manhattan in New York City. Designed by architect Kevin Roche and engineering partner John Dinkeloo in the late modernist style, the building was one of the first that Roche-Dinkeloo produced after they became heads of Eero Saarinen's firm.

The building consists of a glass-and-steel cube held up by piers made of concrete and clad with Dakota granite. The main entrance is set along 43rd Street. A second entrance on 42nd Street leads to a large public atrium, the first such atrium in an office building in Manhattan. The atrium contains landscaping from Dan Kiley and includes plants, shrubs, trees, and vines. Most offices in the building are north and west of the atrium and are visible from other offices in the building.

The building was commissioned for the Ford Foundation, then the largest private foundation in the United States, after Henry Heald became foundation president. The Ford Foundation Building was announced in 1963 and completed in 1968 on the former site of the Hospital for the Ruptured and Crippled. Between 2015 and 2018, the Ford Foundation Building underwent a major renovation and restoration project, and it was renamed the Ford Foundation Center for Social Justice. The Ford Foundation Building has been critically acclaimed for its design, both after its completion and after the renovation. The New York City Landmarks Preservation Commission designated the building and its atrium as city landmarks in 1997.

Site 

The Ford Foundation Center for Social Justice is on the south side of 43rd Street, in the middle of the block between First Avenue to the east and Second Avenue to the west. It has addresses at 321 East 42nd Street to the south and 320 East 43rd Street to the north, although the 43rd Street entrance is the main entrance. The Hospital for Ruptured and Crippled Children (now the Hospital for Special Surgery) previously occupied the plot.

The building is less than one block west of the headquarters of the United Nations, and it is surrounded by the Tudor City development. The Daily News Building is diagonally across 42nd Street and Second Avenue to the southwest. In addition, the Beaux-Arts Institute of Design and Beaux-Arts Apartments are one block north.

43rd Street is a one-way street sloping down from Tudor City to the rest of the Manhattan grid. Because of the street grid of the area, vehicles traveling to the building must travel eastward on 41st Street from Second Avenue, then turn onto Tudor City Plaza (which crosses 42nd Street), and then turn again onto 43rd Street. This creates a "scenic" approach for the main entrance. One architectural critic said that the complicated approach path was "not an accident but conscious contrivance". Kevin Roche, one of the architects, stated that the approach to the building was intended to be similar to that in a rural setting. Due to the topography, the 43rd Street entrance leads to the second floor, while the rear entrance on 42nd Street leads to the first floor. The spaces between the lot lines and the facades on 42nd and 43rd Streets contain red-brown brick pavers.

Architecture
It was designed by Eero Saarinen Associates (renamed Roche-Dinkeloo in 1966), composed of Kevin Roche and John Dinkeloo, who took over the firm after its namesake Eero Saarinen died in 1961. Roche was involved primarily in design, while Dinkeloo oversaw the construction. Turner Construction was the contractor for the building.

The building is set back about  behind the lot line. Its 12-story height was chosen because that was the same height as the second-lowest setback on the adjacent office tower on 42nd Street. The design was intended to highlight the Ford Foundation Building as the eastern terminus of the succession of commercial structures along 42nd Street's northern sidewalk. Roche stated that the building could have been built up to  times its ultimate size and thus have more office space that could be rented. In addition, zoning regulations allowed the building to rise up to  before setting back. However, the building's developer Ford Foundation wanted it to be at a relatively low height as "a public gesture". Roche also wanted the building to be a main part of what author Eeva-Liisa Pelkonen called a "larger urban context".

Facade

The facade includes concrete piers and walls clad with gray-pink or mahogany South Dakota granite. A significant portion of the facade is a glass wall with weathering steel, and over 60,000 panes were used in the construction. These materials were said to "harmonize" with Tudor City's red-brick facades; although Roche criticized Tudor City as "a phony piece of stage-set architecture", he still perceived the setting as containing "a fairly nice character". The weathering steel was used because exposed structural steel was not allowed per the city's fire-safety codes at the time. The building contained three large diagonal granite piers, oriented northwest–southeast at a 45-degree angle to the street; Roche said these piers were intended to give visitors the impression that they were "partially in the building" even before entering. The design differentiated between spanning and supporting materials, employing reinforced concrete for supporting structures or simple mass, and using steel for sections of the building that overhung other spaces.

The southern elevation is on 42nd Street. The western part of this elevation is a windowless granite slab. The eastern portion consists of two large granite piers: one at the center of the facade, and one at the southeastern corner. On the eastern section of the facade, the first through tenth stories have a recessed glass wall, while the eleventh and twelfth stories are recessed at a lesser depth and are carried over this recess by a glass-walled enclosure with an I-beam on top. The twelfth story protrudes further out than the eleventh story, and a catwalk hangs underneath the eleventh story. A revolving door is between the two diagonal piers, and there is an additional set of doors in the space between the center pier and the western section of the facade.

The eastern elevation faces Tudor City. It is similar to the 42nd Street elevation: the northern section is clad with granite while the southern section is a recessed glass wall, and there is a diagonally-oriented pier in the center of the facade. The southeast-corner pier does not face onto the eastern elevation. The eleventh and twelfth floors, as well as the catwalk, are also recessed to a lesser extent than the first through tenth floors.

The northern elevation is on 43rd Street. The easternmost part of the facade is a windowless granite slab. The rest of the facade is composed of glass-walled offices between four narrow granite piers that divide the windows into three vertical bays. The second-floor entrance is recessed significantly inward, creating a brick-paved porte-cochère behind the four piers. There are two brass double doors at this entrance. The third and fourth stories are recessed as well, but at a progressively smaller scale, and the eleventh and twelfth stories are also slightly recessed. The setbacks on this elevation were designed to reflect the terraced garden inside.

The western elevation faces a private driveway. It is faced with granite, with a narrow bay of windows and two wider window bays from north to south. This private driveway also has brick pavers, a loading dock, and garage and service entrances.

Interior

Atrium 

It is open to the public during the daytime, and admission is free. The garden inside the atrium was designed by Dan Kiley, one of Saarinen's frequent collaborators. The atrium is more easily accessed from 42nd Street, while the building's lobby is closer to 43rd Street. The lobby contains elevator banks near the northwest corner of the building. On the western side of the atrium is a stair connecting the lobby and atrium. There are also several smaller stairs and ramps. A wheelchair lift at the atrium's southeast corner connects the garden's tiers. 

As originally arranged, the atrium had 18 aquatic plants in a pool, 37 trees, 148 vines, 999 shrubs, and 22,000 ground cover plants. The plantings were arranged around a central square fountain. Kiley had projected that his garden would have "a Darwinian struggle of the fittest", with only some plants surviving the atrium's difficult climactic conditions. However, many of the original plants had to be replaced. By the late 2010s, landscape designer Raymond Jungles of Jungles Studio had replanted the atrium with subtropical flora.

Because of the concentration of skyscrapers in the surrounding area, artificial light was used to illuminate the garden. The atrium was originally lit by 76 spotlights on the eleventh floor and 43 lights at ground level, although these lights were subsequently replaced. Several Dakota granite piers support a glass roof above the atrium, and the paths are made of red-brown brick pavers. A glass roof composed of greenhouse-like "sawtooth" panels is above the atrium. There were originally no benches in the atrium, but a single bench was subsequently added near the water feature.

Roche had intended for the atrium to spur informal encounters and also be a meeting area for the surrounding community. The public atrium contrasted with contemporary International Style structures, which had plazas outside their respective buildings. The greenery was evocative of the small park within Tudor City to the east. Roche stated in 1963 that an indoor garden had not been constructed in a contemporary building but, when interviewed later, stated that such gardens had become more common. Despite Roche's intentions for the atrium, the Ford Foundation did not install any benches (to prevent homeless people from sleeping there overnight), nor did it offer food concessions. The atrium remained publicly accessible after the September 11 attacks in Lower Manhattan in 2001, when public spaces in some buildings across the city were closed off.

Other interior spaces 
The interiors were designed by Warren Platner. Almost every decorative metal piece in the building was made of brass to give the impression that it was gold. Wool rugs were set into the oak flooring, and furniture with leather and mahogany was used. Offices were generally divided into a grid of  modules. The offices of department heads typically measured nine modules wide, while lower-ranking officials had six-module-wide offices. Generally, senior employees occupied the offices that faced the atrium, which Pelkonen called "a utopian suggestion suggesting a cathedral of labor". The effect was blunted by the fact that there were gypsum walls separating the private offices from the corridors behind them. In the late 2010s, these walls were replaced with  workstations, allowing a full view across the atrium.

Most of the building's stories were designed with usable space only on the north and west sides of the building. The northern portions of the fourth through sixth stories are slightly set back behind the floors underneath them, creating three terraces that face the atrium. Planters were placed atop the terraces. The spaces were designed specifically to have offices facing either the atrium or outside onto 43rd Street. Roche said: "It will be possible in this building to look across the court and see your fellow man [...] There will be a total awareness of the foundation’s activities." According to Pelkonen, Roche had indicated in multiple interviews that the atrium's occupants "could not think of themselves as separate from their colleagues". The offices and hallways facing the atrium had sliding doors. Weathering steel is used to frame the glass walls overlooking the atrium, and I-beams supported each floor.

The presidential office suite originally covered  but was divided into three conference rooms in the 2010s. The eleventh and twelfth floors have usable space on all four sides of the building, with an open plan on all four sides. At the centers of these floors are square openings overlooking the atrium. The eleventh and twelfth floors overhang the lower floors as well as the atrium. As originally designed, the eleventh floor had a  balcony overhanging the atrium, which led to a reception room with mahogany panels on the walls that hid filing cabinets. Another door led to a conference room that could seat 40 persons around a  table with a leather surface. An executive dining room on the top stories was also eliminated in the 2010s. To meet fire-safety regulations, the eleventh floor of the atrium contains sprinklers, a fire curtain, and an exhaust system.

According to blueprints, the elevators and one set of emergency stairs are on the western side of the building, near the northwest corner. Another set of emergency stairs are on the northeast corner. There are also emergency stairs within the diagonal piers on the eastern and southern sides of the building, at the ends of the northern and western wings respectively. In addition, there is an auditorium and conference room in the basement. This auditorium contains a tapestry by Sheila Hicks.

History 
The Ford Foundation was established in Michigan in 1936 as a foundation for the family of Henry Ford, who had founded the Ford Motor Company. In 1949, after a report by Horace Rowan Gaither, the foundation was reorganized to focus on economic improvements, education, freedom and democracy, human behavior, and world peace. By 1950, it was the largest private foundation in the United States, and its assets were valued at about $474 million. The foundation had its main offices in Pasadena, California, and satellite offices in Detroit and New York City. The New York office was at 477 Madison Avenue, where the foundation leased nine floors. In 1953, the New York location became the main office when the Pasadena office closed, and the foundation leased three more floors at 477 Madison Avenue the next year.

Planning and construction 

The foundation's activities were changed in 1962 to focus on education, public, economic, and international affairs, as well as the arts and sciences. The next year, the foundation bought land facing 42nd and 43rd Streets for its headquarters. At the time, it was relatively rare for private foundations to construct headquarters that were highly publicized. However, the foundation's president at the time, Henry Townley Heald, had previously headed the Illinois Institute of Technology, where he had overseen the construction of a new campus. The building was to be designed by Joseph N. Lacy, John Dinkeloo, and Kevin Roche of Eero Saarinen Associates. During the planning process, Roche created colorized diagrams of the site, which he presented to the Ford Foundation's leadership.

Final plans for the Ford Foundation Building were announced in September 1964 at a cost of $10 million. At the time, construction was to begin the next month and be finished in 1966. In designing the building, Roche said: "It's really very important in that kind of community for each to be aware of the other, for their common aim to be reinforced." This philosophy influenced his decision to place offices only on two sides of the atrium. During construction, in April 1967, a construction crane fell onto 42nd Street and injured four people.

Usage 
The building opened on December 8, 1967. It had cost about $16 million to erect. Due to the design of the building's glass walls, it was difficult for window washers to clean the structure, as they could only access the facade from the ground. As such, only the windows on the lowest two floors could initially be cleaned. The New York State Board of Standards and Appeals, which oversaw window-washing operations for the state's buildings, refused to approve a plan for the Ford Foundation Building's windows to be cleaned, so the windows gathered dust for the first two years after the building's completion. After the Foundation modified the location of the window-washing terminals for safety reasons, the Board approved a window-washing plan in 1969.

The Ford Foundation Building was intended to provide offices for 600 workers. In 1975, during the ongoing recession, the Ford Foundation announced that it would lay off half its employees due to portfolio losses, and would consider renting out office space in the building. The foundation's grants decreased significantly during the recession, from $197 million in 1973 to $75.8 million in 1979, though it still remained the largest private foundation in the U.S. When Franklin A. Thomas became CEO of the foundation in 1979, several rumors about his office at the building circulated, including that he had installed planters at the windows outside his office, or that he had requested all 10th floor offices except his own to be vacated.

The New York City Landmarks Preservation Commission (LPC) designated the Ford Foundation Building's exterior and atrium, along with the exteriors of the Manufacturers Trust Company Building and the CBS Building, as city landmarks on October 21, 1997. The Landmarks Preservation Commission called the building "one of the most successful and admired modern buildings to emerge in New York City following World War II." For several years afterward, the Ford Foundation Building was the youngest building to have city landmark status, having been completed 30 years prior to its designation. The design of the Ford Foundation Building, as well as its namesake's wealth, preserved the building during the early 21st century, when several other 1960s-era structures by Roche and other architects were being destroyed. 

In 2015, the Ford Foundation announced that the building would be renovated for $190 million. The building no longer complied with fire-safety codes, and the building would become environmentally friendly and compliant with the Americans with Disabilities Act of 1990. The LPC approved the plans in April 2016. During the renovation, the foundation moved to temporary offices nearby. Darren Walker, president of the Ford Foundation, wanted as many of the elements of the original structure to be preserved as possible, though the presidential suite would be removed to create a less imposing environment. The renovation also added some event space. The architecture firm Gensler completed the project in late 2018 at an ultimate cost of $205 million. After the renovation was finished, the building became known as the Ford Foundation Center for Social Justice, reflecting the fact that the renovation had added space for social-justice groups.

Critical reception and landmark status

The Ford Foundation Building's design deviated from that of major corporate headquarters, and several critics noted such. One observer, James Burns Jr., said that "this building could not and would not have been built by a corporation", citing the Seagram Building, Lever House, and CBS Building as instances of corporate structures with distinctive designs. Architecture critics praised the Ford Foundation Building as a symbol. Paul Goldberger said the building's "very presence [...] benefits the entire city",  William Zinsser described it as "an act of faith in the midst of ruin", and Ada Louise Huxtable called it a "civic gesture of beauty and excellence". Another critic at The New York Times said the "design concept is fresh and radical change from the four-sided, glassed-in box". Critic Jonathan Barnett described the building's cube-like form as "an ancient symbol of power" similar to that utilized in religious institutions. According to the New York Times, the Ford Foundation Building "established [Roche] firmly as a designer on his own", where previously his work had been associated mainly with Saarinen.

The atrium was also the subject of critical acclaim and inspired the inclusion of indoor gardens in other buildings citywide. Goldberger called the atrium "one of the city's most spectacular interior spaces", and Barnett described it as "a tremendously generous gift" for the city. Vincent Scully characterized the structure as having a "military scale" with a "sultanic inner garden". A critic in the British magazine Country Life said that the atrium, one of the relatively few areas of greenery in Midtown Manhattan, probably inspired enthusiasm for the headquarters' opening. Another critic for Interiors magazine called the atrium "amazingly interesting to explore", while Huxtable described it as "probably one of the most romantic environments ever devised by corporate man". Conversely, Herbert Muschamp wrote for the Times that the atrium was unwelcoming compared to the contemporary Paley Park in Midtown: "People could enter the building and walk through the atrium along a straight and narrow path but were not allowed to sit or even loiter there." Some publications, such as the first edition of the AIA Guide to New York City and the Interiors magazine, characterized the atrium as being practical, in the sense that it provided fresh air to the offices. At the time of the building's completion, there was no specific zoning guidance regarding indoor public spaces in New York City buildings; the city government later introduced zoning codes specifically for indoor public areas.

After the 2018 renovation, Archpaper said "you’d never know the crisp and clean, 415,000-square-foot building felt darker and smaller just four years ago." Metropolis magazine said "The reimagining is refreshingly restrained and in keeping with Roche Dinkeloo’s original tailored look and feel." A Times reporter stated that the design prior to the renovation had been "a Mad Men-era version of a Gesamtkunstwerk, a complete work of art". After Roche's death the following year, Goldberger said in the Times that the building's design "united his favorite forms and materials—large amounts of glass, emphatic masonry and dark Cor-ten steel—with the elegance of [Kiley's] interior garden".

The design won several architectural accolades as well. In 1968, the Ford Foundation Building and Paley Park shared an Albert S. Bard Civic Award, distributed to structures that exhibited "excellence in architecture and urban design". In addition, the building won the AIA Twenty-five Year Award in 1995. A year before the building became a city landmark in 1997, architect Robert A. M. Stern described the Ford Foundation Building as one of his favorites out of a list of 35 structures that he thought should have city landmark status. Despite this, Roche only visited the building "three or four times" in the four decades after its completion.

See also
 List of New York City Designated Landmarks in Manhattan from 14th to 59th Streets

References

Notes

Citations

Sources

External links
 
 

1967 establishments in New York City
42nd Street (Manhattan)
Ford Motor Company facilities
Modernist architecture in New York City
New York City Designated Landmarks in Manhattan
New York City interior landmarks
Office buildings completed in 1967
Office buildings in Manhattan
Roche-Dinkeloo buildings
Turtle Bay, Manhattan